The Mesoamerican Long Count calendar is a non-repeating base-20 and base-18 calendar used by several pre-Columbian Mesoamerican cultures, most notably the Maya. For this reason, it is often known as the Maya Long Count calendar. Using a modified vigesimal tally, the Long Count calendar identifies a day by counting the number of days passed since a mythical creation date that corresponds to August 11, 3114 BCE in the proleptic Gregorian calendar. The Long Count calendar was widely used on monuments.

Background
The two most widely used calendars in pre-Columbian Mesoamerica were the 260-day Tzolkʼin and the 365-day Haabʼ. The equivalent Aztec calendars are known in Nahuatl as the Tonalpohualli and Xiuhpohualli.

The combination of a Haabʼ and a Tzolkʼin date identifies a day in a combination which does not occur again for 18,980 days (52 Haabʼ cycles of 365 days equals 73 Tzolkʼin cycles of 260 days, approximately 52 years), a period known as the Calendar Round. To identify days over periods longer than this, Mesoamericans used the Long Count calendar.

Long Count periods

The Long Count calendar identifies a date by counting the number of days from a starting date that is generally calculated to be August 11, 3114 BCE in the proleptic Gregorian calendar or September 6 in the Julian calendar (or −3113 in astronomical year numbering). There has been much debate over the precise correlation between the Western calendars and the Long Count calendars. The August 11 date is based on the GMT correlation.

The completion of 13 bʼakʼtuns (August 11, 3114 BCE) marks the Creation of the world of human beings according to the Maya. On this day, Raised-up-Sky-Lord caused three stones to be set by associated gods at Lying-Down-Sky, First-Three-Stone-Place. Because the sky still lay on the primordial sea, it was black. The setting of the three stones centered the cosmos which allowed the sky to be raised, revealing the 

Rather than using a base 10 scheme, the Long Count days were tallied in a modified base-20 scheme. In a pure base 20 scheme, 0.0.0.1.5 is equal to 25 and 0.0.0.2.0 is equal to 40. The Long Count is not pure base-20, however, since the second digit from the right (and only that digit) rolls over to zero when it reaches 18. Thus 0.0.1.0.0 does not represent 400 days, but rather only 360 days and 0.0.0.17.19 represents 359 days.

The name bʼakʼtun was invented by modern scholars. The numbered Long Count was no longer in use by the time the Spanish arrived in the Yucatán Peninsula, although unnumbered kʼatuns and tuns were still in use. Instead the Maya were using an abbreviated Short Count.

Mesoamerican numerals

Long Count dates are written with Mesoamerican numerals, as shown on this table. A dot represents 1 while a bar equals 5. The shell glyph was used to represent the zero concept. The Long Count calendar required the use of zero as a place-holder and presents one of the earliest uses of the zero concept in history.

On Maya monuments, the Long Count syntax is more complex. The date sequence is given once, at the beginning of the inscription and opens with the so-called ISIG (Introductory Series Initial Glyph) which reads tzik-a(h) habʼ [patron of Haabʼ month] ("revered was the year-count with the patron [of the month]").  Next come the 5 digits of the Long Count, followed by the Calendar Round (tzolkʼin and Haabʼ) and supplementary series. The supplementary series is optional and contains lunar data, for example, the age of the moon on the day and the calculated length of current lunation. The text then continues with whatever activity occurred on that date.

A drawing of a full Maya Long Count inscription is shown below.

Earliest Long Counts
The earliest contemporaneous Long Count inscription yet discovered is on Stela 2 at Chiapa de Corzo, Chiapas, Mexico, showing a date of 36 BCE, although Stela 2 from Takalik Abaj, Guatemala might be earlier.  Takalik Abaj Stela 2's highly battered Long Count inscription shows 7 bak'tuns, followed by k'atuns with a tentative 6 coefficient, but that could also be 11 or 16, giving the range of possible dates to fall between 236 and 19 BCE.

Although Takalik Abaj Stela 2 remains controversial, this table includes it, as well as six other artifacts with the eight oldest Long Count inscriptions according to Dartmouth professor Vincent H. Malmström (two of the artifacts contain two dates and Malmström does not include Takalik Abaj Stela 2). Interpretations of inscriptions on some artifacts differ.

Of the six sites, three are on the western edge of the Maya homeland and three are several hundred kilometers further west, leading some researchers to believe that the Long Count calendar predates the Maya. La Mojarra Stela 1, the Tuxtla Statuette, Tres Zapotes Stela C and Chiapa Stela 2 are all inscribed in an Epi-Olmec, not Maya, style. El Baúl Stela 2, on the other hand, was created in the Izapan style.

The first unequivocally Maya artifact is Stela 29 from Tikal, with the Long Count date of 292 CE (8.12.14.8.15), more than 300 years after Stela 2 from Chiapa de Corzo.

More recently, with the discovery in Guatemala of the San Bartolo (Maya site) stone block text ( 300 BCE), it has been argued that this text celebrates an upcoming time period ending celebration. This time period may have been projected to end sometime between 7.3.0.0.0 and 7.5.0.0.0 — 295 and 256 BCE, respectively.  Besides this being the earliest Maya hieroglyphic text so far uncovered, it would arguably be the earliest glyphic evidence to date of Long Count notation in Mesoamerica.

Correlations between Western calendars and the Long Count

The Maya and Western calendars are correlated by using a Julian day number (JDN) of the starting date of the current creation — 13.0.0.0.0, 4 Ajaw, 8 Kumkʼu. This is referred to as a "correlation constant". The generally accepted correlation constant is the Modified Thompson 2, "Goodman–Martinez–Thompson", or GMT correlation of 584,283 days. Using the GMT correlation, the current creation started on September 6, −3113 (Julian astronomical) – August 11, 3114 BCE in the Proleptic Gregorian calendar. The study of correlating the Maya and western calendar is referred to as the correlation question. The GMT correlation is also called the 11.16 correlation.

In Breaking the Maya Code, Michael D. Coe writes: "In spite of oceans of ink that have been spilled on the subject, there now is not the slightest chance that these three scholars (conflated to G-M-T when talking about the correlation) were not right ...". The evidence for the GMT correlation is historical, astronomical and archaeological:

Historical: Calendar Round dates with a corresponding Julian date are recorded in Diego de Landa's Relación de las cosas de Yucatán (written circa 1566), the Chronicle of Oxcutzkab and the books of Chilam Balam. De Landa records a date that is a Tun ending in the Short Count. Oxkutzcab contains 12 Tun endings. Bricker and Bricker find that only the GMT correlation in consistent with these dates. The Book of Chilam Balam of Chumayel contains the only colonial reference to classic long-count dates. The Julian calendar date of 11.16.0.0.0 (November 2, 1539) confirms the GMT correlation.

The Annals of the Cakchiquels contains numerous Tzolkʼin dates correlated with European dates. These confirm the GMT correlation. Weeks, Sachse and Prager transcribed three divinatory calendars from highland Guatemala. They found that the 1772 calendar confirms the GMT correlation. The fall of the capital city of the Aztec Empire, Tenochtitlan, occurred on August 13, 1521. A number of different chroniclers wrote that this was a Tzolkʼin (Tonalpohualli) of 1 Snake.

Post-conquest scholars such as Sahagún and Durán recorded Tonalpohualli dates with a calendar date. Many indigenous communities in the Mexican states of Veracruz, Oaxaca and Chiapas and in Guatemala, principally those speaking the Mayan languages Ixil, Mam, Pokomchí and Quiché, keep the Tzolkʼin and in many cases the Haabʼ. These are all consistent with the GMT correlation. Munro Edmonsen studied 60 Mesoamerican calendars, 20 of which have known correlations to European calendars, and found remarkable consistency among them and that only the GMT correlation fits the historical, ethnographic and astronomical evidence.

Astronomical: Any correct correlation must match the astronomical content of classic inscriptions. The GMT correlation does an excellent job of matching lunar data in the supplementary series. For example: An inscription at the Temple of the Sun at Palenque records that on Long Count 9.16.4.10.8 there were 26 days completed in a 30 day lunation. This Long Count is also the entry date for the eclipse table of the Dresden Codex.

Using the third method (the Palenque system) the new moon would have been the first evening when one could look to the west after sunset and see the thin crescent moon. Given our modern ability to know exactly where to look, when the crescent Moon is favorably located, from an excellent site, on rare occasions, using binoculars or a telescope, observers can see and photograph the crescent moon less than one day after conjunction. Generally, most observers cannot see the new Moon with the naked eye until the first evening when the lunar phase day is at least 1.5. If one assumes that the new moon is the first day when the lunar phase day is at least 1.5 at six in the evening in time zone UTC−6 (the time zone of the Maya area) the GMT correlation will match many lunar inscriptions exactly. This works well for many but not all lunar inscriptions.

Modern astronomers refer to the conjunction of the Sun and Moon (the time when the Sun and Moon have the same ecliptic longitude) as the new moon. Mesoamerican astronomy was observational not theoretical. The people of Mesoamerica didn't know about the Copernican nature of the solar system — they had no theoretical understanding of the orbital nature of the heavenly bodies. Some authors analyze the lunar inscriptions based on this modern understanding of the motions of the Moon but there is no evidence that the Mesoamericans did.

The first method seems to have been used for other inscriptions such as Quirgua stela E (9.17.0.0.0). Using the third method it should have a moon age of 26 days when in fact it records a new moon. Using the GMT correlation at six AM in time zone −6, this would be 2.25 days before conjunction, so it could record the first day when one could not see the waning moon.

Fuls Analysed these inscriptions and found strong evidence for the Palenque system and the GMT correlation however he cautioned: "Analysis of the Lunar Series shows that at least two different methods and formulas were used to calculate the moon's age and position in the six-month cycle ..." which gives eclipse seasons when the Moon is near its ascending or descending node and an eclipse is likely to occur. Dates converted using the GMT correlation agree closely with the Dresden Codex eclipse tables. The Dresden Codex contains a Venus table which records the heliacal risings of Venus. Using the GMT correlation these agree closely with modern astronomical calculations.

Archaeological: Various items that can be associated with specific Long Count dates have been isotope dated. In 1959 the University of Pennsylvania carbon dated samples from ten wood lintels from Tikal. These were carved with a date equivalent to 741 AD, using the GMT correlation. The average carbon date was 746±34 years. Recently one of these, Lintel 3 from Temple I, was analyzed again using more accurate methods and found to agree closely with the GMT correlation.

If a proposed correlation only has to agree with one of these lines of evidence there could be numerous other possibilities. Astronomers have proposed many correlations, for example: Lounsbury, Fuls, et al., Böhm and Böhm and Stock.

2012 and the Long Count

According to the Popol Vuh, a book compiling details of creation accounts known to the Kʼicheʼ Maya of the Colonial-era highlands, humankind lives in the fourth world. The Popol Vuh describes the first three creations that the gods failed in making and the creation of the successful fourth world where men were placed. In the Maya Long Count, the previous creation ended at the end of a 13th bʼakʼtun.

The previous creation ended on a Long Count of 12.19.19.17.19. Another 12.19.19.17.19 occurred on December 20, 2012 (Gregorian Calendar), followed by the start of the 14th bʼakʼtun, 13.0.0.0.0, on December 21, 2012. There are only two references to the current creation's 13th bʼakʼtun in the fragmentary Mayan corpus: Tortuguero Monument 6, part of a ruler's inscription and the recently discovered La Corona Hieroglyphic Stairway 2, Block V.

Maya inscriptions occasionally reference future predicted events or commemorations that would occur on dates that lie beyond 2012 (that is, beyond the completion of the 13th bʼakʼtun of the current era). Most of these are in the form of "distance dates" where some Long Count date is given, together with a Distance Number that is to be added to the Long Count date to arrive at this future date.

For example, on the west panel at the Temple of Inscriptions in Palenque, a section of the text projects into the future to the 80th Calendar Round (CR) 'anniversary' of the famous Palenque ruler Kʼinich Janaabʼ Pakal's accession to the throne (Pakal's accession occurred on a Calendar Round date 5 Lamat 1 Mol, at Long Count 9.9.2.4.8 equivalent to 27 July 615 CE in the proleptic Gregorian calendar). It does this by commencing with Pakal's birthdate 9.8.9.13.0   8 Ajaw 13 Pop (24 March ) and adding to it the Distance Number 10.11.10.5.8.

The inscription notes that this day would fall eight days after the completion of the 1st piktun (since the creation or zero date of the Long Count system), where the piktun is the next-highest order above the bʼakʼtun in the Long Count. If the completion date of that piktun—13 October 4772—were to be written out in Long Count notation, it could be represented as 1.0.0.0.0.0. The 80th CR anniversary date, eight days later, would be 1.0.0.0.0.8   5 Lamat 1 Mol.

Despite the publicity generated by the 2012 date, Susan Milbrath, curator of Latin American Art and Archaeology at the Florida Museum of Natural History, stated that "We have no record or knowledge that [the Maya] would think the world would come to an end" in 2012. USA Today writes For the ancient Maya, it was a huge celebration to make it to the end of a whole cycle,' says Sandra Noble, executive director of the Foundation for the Advancement of Mesoamerican Studies in Crystal River, Florida. To render December 21, 2012, as a doomsday event or moment of cosmic shifting, she says, is 'a complete fabrication and a chance for a lot of people to cash in. "There will be another cycle," says E. Wyllys Andrews V, director of the Tulane University Middle American Research Institute (MARI). "We know the Maya thought there was one before this, and that implies they were comfortable with the idea of another one after this."

Converting between the Long Count and western calendars

Calculating a Western calendar date from a Long Count

It is important to know the difference between the Julian and Gregorian calendars when calculating a Western calendar date from a Long Count date.

Using as an example the Long Count date of 9.10.11.17.0 (Long Count date mentioned on the Palenque Palace Tablet), first calculate the number of days that have passed since the zero date (August 11, 3114 BCE; GMT correlation, in the Proleptic Gregorian calendar, September 6, −3113 Julian astronomical).

Then add the GMT correlation to the total number of days.

 1,372,300 + 584,283 = 1,956,583

This number is a Julian day.

To convert a Julian day to a Proleptic Gregorian calendar date:

From this number, subtract the nearest smaller Julian Day Number (in the table below), in this case 1,940,206, which corresponds to the year 600 CE.

 1,956,583 – 1,940,206 = 16,377

Next, divide this number by 365 days (vague year).

 16,377 / 365 = 44.86849

The remainder is 44.86849 years, which is 44 years and 317 days. The full year date is 644 CE. Now calculate the month and day number, taking into account leap days over the 44 years. In the Gregorian Calendar, every fourth year is a leap year with the exception of centuries not evenly divisible by 400 (e.g. 100, 200, 300). When the year is divisible by 400 (e.g. 400, 800, etc.), do not add an extra day. The calculated year is 644 CE. The number of leap days, keeping in mind that the year 600 is not a leap year, is 10. Subtracting that from 317 remainder days is 307; in other words, the 307th day of the year 644 CE, which is November 3.
To summarize: the Long Count date 9.10.11.17.0 corresponds to November 3, 644 CE, in the Proleptic Gregorian calendar.

To convert a Julian day to a Julian/Gregorian astronomical date (Proleptic Julian calendar before 46 BCE):

Use an astronomical algorithm such as the Method of Meeus to convert the Julian day to a Julian/Gregorian date with astronomical dating of negative years:

In this example:

 input: Julian day J
 J = J + 0.5    // 1,956,583.5
 Z = integer part of J           // 1,956,583
 F = fraction part of J          // 0.5
 
 if Z < 2,299,161 then // Julian?
     A = Z
 else
     alpha = floor((Z - 1,867,216.25) / 36,524.25)   // 15
     A = Z + 1 + alpha - floor(alpha / 4.0)          // 2,436,129
     // The floor operation rounds a decimal number down to the next lowest integer.
     // For example, floor(1.5) = 1 and floor(−1.5) = -2
 end if
 
 B = A + 1524                     // 1,958,107
 C = floor((B - 122.1) / 365.25)  // 5,360
 D = floor(365.25 × C)            // 1,957,740
 E = floor((B - D) / 30.6001)     // 11
 day = B - D - floor(30.6001 × E) + F   // 31.5
 
 if E < 14 then
     month = E - 1   // 10
 else
     month = E - 13
 end if
 
 if month > 2 then
     year = C - 4716    // 644
 else
     year = C - 4715
 end if
 
 return (year, month, day)

In this example the Julian date is noon October 31, 644. The Method of Meeus is not valid for negative year numbers (astronomical), so another method such as the method of Peter Baum should be used.

Calculating a full Long Count date

A full Long Count date not only includes the five digits of the Long Count, but the 2 character Tzolkʼin and the two-character Haabʼ dates as well. The five digit Long Count can therefore be confirmed with the other four characters (the "calendar round date").

Taking as an example a Calendar Round date of 9.12.2.0.16 (Long Count) 5 Kibʼ (Tzolkʼin) 14 Yaxkʼin (Haabʼ). One can check whether this date is correct by the following calculation.

It is perhaps easier to find out how many days there are since 4 Ajaw 8 Kumkʼu and show how the date 5 Kibʼ 14 Yaxkʼin is derived.

Calculating the Tzolkʼin date portion
The Tzolkʼin date is counted forward from 4 Ajaw. To calculate the numerical portion of the Tzolkʼin date, add 4 to the total number of days given by the date and then divide total number of days by 13.

 (4 + 1,383,136) / 13 = 106,395 (and 5/13)

This means that 106,395 whole 13 day cycles have been completed and the numerical portion of the Tzolkʼin date is 5.

To calculate the day, divide the total number of days in the long count by 20 since there are twenty day names.

1,383,136 / 20 = 69,156 (and 16/20)

This means 16 day names must be counted from Ajaw. This gives Kibʼ. Therefore, the Tzolkʼin date is 5 Kibʼ.

Calculating the Haabʼ date portion
The Haabʼ date 8 Kumkʼu is the ninth day of the eighteenth month. There are 17 days to the start of the next year.

Subtract 17 days from the total, to find how many complete Haabʼ years are contained.

1,383,136 − 17 = 1,383,119

 by 365

1,383,119 / 365 = 3,789 and (134/365)

Therefore, 3,789 complete Haabʼ have passed and the remainder 134 is the 135th day in the new Haabʼ, since a remainder of 0 would indicate the first day.

Find which month the day is in. Dividing the remainder 134 by 20, is six complete months and a remainder of 14, indicating the 15th day. So, the date in the Haabʼ lies in the seventh month, which is Yaxkʼin. The fifteenth day of Yaxkʼin is 14, thus the Haabʼ date is 14 Yaxkʼin.

So the date of the long count date 9.12.2.0.16   5 Kibʼ 14 Yaxkʼin is confirmed.

Piktuns and higher orders
There are also four rarely used higher-order periods above the bʼakʼtun: piktun, kalabtun, kʼinchiltun and alautun. All of these words are inventions of Mayanists. Each one consists of 20 of the lesser units.

Many inscriptions give the date of the current creation as a large number of 13s preceding 13.0.0.0.0   4 Ahau 8 Kumkʼu. For example, a Late Classic monument from Coba, Stela 1. The date of creation is expressed as 13.13.13.13.13.13.13.13.13.13.13.13.13.13.13.13.13.13.13.13.0.0.0.0, where the units are 13s in the nineteen places larger than the bʼakʼtun. Some authors think that the 13s were symbolic of a completion and don't represent an actual number.

Most inscriptions that use these are in the form of distance dates and Long Reckonings – they give a base date, a distance number that is added or subtracted and the resulting Long Count.

The first example below is from Schele (1987). The second is from Stuart (2005 pp. 60, 77)

Palenque Temple of the Cross, tablet, Schele (1987 p.)
12.19.13.4.0   8 Ajaw 18 Tzek in the prior era
6.14.0 Distance number linking to the "era date"
13.0.0.0.0   4 Ajaw 8 Kumkʼu

Palenque Temple XIX, South Panel G2-H6 Stuart (2005 pp. 60, 77)
12.10.1.13.2   9 Ikʼ 5 Mol   (seating of GI in the prior era)
2.8.3.8.0
1.18.5.3.2   9 Ikʼ 15 Keh   (rebirth of GI, this date also in Temple of the Cross)

The tablet of the inscriptions contains this inscription:
9.8.9.13.0   8 Ajaw 13 Pop
10.11.10.5.8
1.0.0.0.0.8

The Dresden codex contains another method for writing distance numbers. These are Ring Numbers. Specific dates within the 
Dresden codex are often given by calculations involving Ring Numbers. Förstemann identified these, but Wilson (1924) later clarified the way in which they operate. Ring Numbers are intervals of days between the Era Base date 4 Ajaw 8 Kumkʼu and an earlier Ring Base date, where the place-holder for the numeral of days in the interval is circled by an image of a tied red band. Added to this earlier Ring Base date is another count of days forward, which Thompson refers to as a Long Round, leading to a final date within the Long Count that is given as an entry date to be used within a specific table in the codex.

Ring number     (12) 12.12.17.3.1   13 Imix 9 Wo (7.2.14.19 before (13) 13.0.0.0.0)
distance number (0) 10.13.13.3.2
Long Count              10.6.10.6.3   13 Akʼbal 1 Kankʼin

Ring number (portion of the DN preceding era date)  7.2.14.19
Add Ring number to the ring number date to reach 13.0.0.0.0

Thompson contains a table of typical long reckonings after Satterwaite.

The "Serpent Numbers" in the Dresden codex pp. 61–69 is a table of dates using a base date of 1.18.1.8.0.16 in the prior era (5,482,096 days).

See also
 Aztec calendar
 Maya astronomy
 Maya calendar
 Maya codices
 Mesoamerican calendars

Notes

References

Bibliography

External links
 Coba Stela 1 (Schele #4087), partial illustration from the Linda Schele Drawings Collection of the monument from Coba with an expanded Long Count date
 Maya calendar on michielb.nl, with conversion applet from Gregorian calendar to Maya date (Uses the proleptic Gregorian calendar.)
 The Dresden Codex Lunar Series and Sidereal Astronomy
  1897 text by Cyrus Thomas.

Long Count
Maya Classic Period
Specific calendars
Chronology
Obsolete calendars
2012 phenomenon

it:Calendario maya#Il Lungo computo